The 1991 Arab Cup Winners' Cup was the second edition of the Arab Cup Winners' Cup held in Dubai, United Arab Emirates between 3 – 16 Dec 1991. The teams represented Arab nations from Africa and Asia.
CO Casablanca of Morocco won the final against El-Mokawloon El-Arab of Egypt.

Group stage

Group 1

Group 2

Knock-out stage

Semi-finals

Final

Winners

External links
Arab Cup Winners' Cup 1991 - rsssf.com

Arab Cup Winners' Cup
1991 in association football
International association football competitions hosted by the United Arab Emirates
1991 in Emirati sport